Joanna "Jo" Halls (born 20 October 1973) is an Australian fencer. She competed in the women's individual foil events at the 2000 and 2008 Summer Olympics.

References

External links
 

1973 births
Living people
Australian female foil fencers
Olympic fencers of Australia
Fencers at the 2000 Summer Olympics
Fencers at the 2008 Summer Olympics
Sportspeople from Melbourne